Obaidur Rahman Nawbab (born 18 December 1998) is a Bangladeshi footballer who plays as a winger and can also be deployed as an attacking midfielder. He started his club career with  Al-Duhail SC in the Qatar Stars League, and made his league debut against Al-Sailiya SC on 7 March 2020.

References

Living people
1998 births
Bangladesh Football Premier League players
Bangladeshi footballers
Al-Duhail SC players
Sheikh Jamal Dhanmondi Club
Bashundhara Kings players
Association football wingers
Muktijoddha Sangsad KC players